is a Japanese former professional footballer who played as a forward.

Career
Murakami was born in Yokohama, Kanagawa, Japan. He played for the Yokohama Flugels and Yokohama F Marinos youth teams as well as Meiji University. He also played for regional league side YSCC Yokohama and futsal with Predator Urayasu Futsal Club.

He entered professional football in Singapore's S League when he joined Albirex Niigata (S) mid-way through the 2004 season. He joined Balestier Khalsa FC in 2006 and then Singapore Armed Forces FC in 2007. In 2008, Murakami was the second top scorer for Singapore Armed Forces FC. However, he was released at the end of the season. In March 2009, he signed for Home United FC but left five months later for South African club Platinum Stars. During the 2009–10 season Murakami scored four goals in ten starts. However, in August 2010, Murakami was released by the Platinum Stars.

Honours
Singapore Armed Forces
S.League: 2007, 2008
Singapore Cup: 2007, 2008

References

External links
data2.7m.cn

kickoff.com

1981 births
Living people
Sportspeople from Yokohama
Japanese footballers
Association football midfielders
Singapore Premier League players
3. Liga players
Regionalliga players
YSCC Yokohama players
Albirex Niigata Singapore FC players
Balestier Khalsa FC players
Warriors FC players
Home United FC players
Platinum Stars F.C. players
Lamontville Golden Arrows F.C. players
Alemannia Aachen players
SV Wilhelmshaven players
1. FC Lokomotive Leipzig players
Japanese expatriate footballers
Japanese expatriate sportspeople in Singapore
Expatriate footballers in Singapore
Expatriate soccer players in South Africa
Japanese expatriate sportspeople in Cambodia
Expatriate footballers in Cambodia
Japanese expatriate sportspeople in Germany
Expatriate footballers in Germany